The Stillaguamish Tribe of Indians, formerly known as the Stillaguamish Tribe of Washington, is a federally recognized tribe of Stillaguamish people. They are a tribe of Southern Coast Salish indigenous people of the Pacific Northwest located in Washington.

Other Stillaguamish people are enrolled in the Tulalip Tribes.

Name
The name has been used since 1850 to refer to indigenous peoples living along the Stillaguamish River. In 1855, they used the name Stoluck-wa-mish, which is how they sign the Point Elliott Treaty.

Reservation
The Stillaguamish Tribe's trust lands are located in Snohomish County, Washington. The tribe was granted a  reservation by the federal government in 2014.

Government
The Stillaguamish Tribe of Indians is headquartered in Arlington, Washington. They ratified their constitution on 31 January 1953. The tribe is governed by a six-member, democratically elected Board of Directors. As of 1 July 2022 the board was as follows:
 Chairman: Eric White
 Vice Chairman: Jeremy Smith
 Treasurer: Tara Smith
 Secretary: Kadi Bizyayeva
 Member: Gary Tatro
 Member: Stacy White.

The tribe petitioned the US federal government for federal recognition in 1974; it was granted on 7 February 1979.

Language
English is commonly spoken  by the tribe. Formerly tribal members spoke Lushootseed, a Central Salish language. The language is written in the Latin script and a dictionary and grammar have been written in the Lushootseed.

Economic Development
The Stillaguamish Tribal Business Development Department develops and works in partnership with the Board of Directors for the tribe's businesses that include River Rock Tobacco & Fuel and the Angel of the Winds Casino Resort, all located in Arlington.

Notes

References
 Pritzker, Barry M. A Native American Encyclopedia: History, Culture, and Peoples. Oxford: Oxford University Press, 2000. .

External links
 Stillaguamish Tribe of Indians, official website
 Esther Ross and the Struggle for Stillaguamish Identity, review by Carter Jones Meyer

Coast Salish governments
Native American tribes in Washington (state)
Geography of Snohomish County, Washington
Federally recognized tribes in the United States
Indigenous peoples of the Pacific Northwest Coast